is a passenger railway station in the city of Tomioka, Gunma, Japan, operated by the private railway operator Jōshin Dentetsu.

Lines

Station layout
The station consists of a single side platform serving traffic in both directions. There is no station building, but only a shelter on the platform. The station is unattended.

Adjacent stations

History
Sendaira Station opened on 18 August 1911.

Surrounding area
The station is located in an isolated rural area.

See also
 List of railway stations in Japan

External links

 Jōshin Dentetsu 
 Burari-Gunma 

Railway stations in Gunma Prefecture
Railway stations in Japan opened in 1911
Tomioka, Gunma